The Man from Tia Juana is a 1917 silent short Western film directed by James W. Horne and starring Marin Sais. It was produced by the Kalem Company and distributed through the General Film Company.

Cast
 Marin Sais - Madge King
 Robert N. Bradbury - Williams from Tia Juana (* uncredited)
 Edward Clisbee - Herman Durkee (* uncredited) 
 Edward Hearn - Larry Kerwin (* uncredited)
 Jack Hoxie - Sheriff (* uncredited)
 Frank Jonasson - Banker Roger King (* uncredited)

Preservation status
A copy is preserved in the Library of Congress collection.

References

External links
 

1917 films
1917 Western (genre) films
1917 short films
American silent short films
American black-and-white films
Films directed by James W. Horne
Kalem Company films
Silent American Western (genre) films
1910s American films
1910s English-language films